Tretyakov, Tretiakov (masculine) or Tretyakova (feminine) is a common Russian surname which means literally '[son] of the third child (son) in family'. Notable people with the surname include:

 Aleksandr Tretyakov (skeleton racer) (born 1985), Russian skeleton racer 
 Nikolai Tretyakov (1854–1917), Russian general
 Pavel Tretyakov (1832–1898), Russian businessman and art collector
 Sergei Tretyakov (arts patron) died 1892, Russian art collector and patron, brother of Pavel
 Sergei Tretyakov (writer) (1892–1937), Russian writer
 Sergei Tretyakov (intelligence officer) (1956–2010), Russian spy and defector
 Sergei Tretyakov (scientist), Russian-Finnish electrical engineer
 Viktor Tretyakov (born 1946), Russian violinist and conductor
 Valery Tretyakov (disambiguation), several people

See also
 Tretyakov Gallery, art gallery in Moscow
 Tretyakovsky Proyezd, street in Moscow

Russian-language surnames